Decision at Thunder Rift is a novel by William H. Keith Jr. published in 1986.

Plot summary
Decision at Thunder Rift is the first BattleTech novel.

Publication history
Shannon Appelcine stated that by 1986, FASA "began creating a metaplot for Battletech. At first this was just reflected in yearly updates: the Battletech Technical Readout: 3025 (1986) was soon replaced by the Battletech Technical Readout: 3026 (1987). However, FASA had simultaneously begun publishing fiction—starting with William H. Keith Jr.'s Decision at Thunder Rift (1986).

See Also
List of BattleTech novels

Reviews
Adventurer (Issue 6 - Jan 1986)
White Wolf #7 (1987)

References

1986 novels
BattleTech novels